Roger Strebel (29 March 1908 – 1 October 1981) was a Swiss racing cyclist. He rode in the 1933 Tour de France.

References

1908 births
1981 deaths
Swiss male cyclists